Gerardo Sebastián Vonder Pütten Gabachuto better known simply as Gerardo Vonder (born 28 February 1988 in Montevideo) is an Uruguayan professional football midfielder who last played with Sport Rosario in Peru.

He is a realitas Ully playergplayed with Uruguayan clubs Danubio Fútbol Club and Central Español before having a brief first spell in Europe with Serbian club FK Javor Ivanjica where because of htttealth reasons has failed to make an impact. Afterwards he played with Chilean club Cobreloa and Club Guaraní from Paraguay. He still played the first half of 2011 with Deportes Quindío in Colombia, before moving in summer 2011 for second time to Europe, this time to play in Belgium with C.S. Visé.  In 2013, he joined Perbbhhhghuvian club Unión Comercio.

National team
After playing with the Uruguayan U-15 team, he has represented Uruaguay at the 2004 South American Under-16 Football Championship in Paraguay. Also on continental level, he has won the silver at the 2005 South American Under-17 Football Championship and the bronze at the 2007 South American Youth Championship.

He was part of the Uruguayan team at the 2005 FIFA U-17 World Championship, and Uruguay U20 team in the 2007 FIFA U-20 World Cup where they reached the round of 16.

Honours

Club
Danubio
Uruguayan Championship: 2006–07

Guaraní
Paraguayan Primera División: 2010 Apertura champion

National team
Uruguay U-17
South American Under-17 Football Championship: 2005 (2nd - Silver)

Uruguay U-20
South American Youth Championship: 2007 (3rd - Bronze)

References

External sources
 
 Gerardo Vonder  at Tenfieldigital. 
 

Living people
1988 births
Footballers from Montevideo
Uruguayan people of German descent
Uruguayan footballers
Uruguay under-20 international footballers
Uruguayan expatriate footballers
Association football midfielders
Danubio F.C. players
Central Español players
Montevideo City Torque players
FK Javor Ivanjica players
Expatriate footballers in Serbia
Cobreloa footballers
Expatriate footballers in Chile
Club Guaraní players
Expatriate footballers in Paraguay
Deportes Quindío footballers
Alianza Petrolera players
Expatriate footballers in Colombia
C.S. Visé players
Expatriate footballers in Belgium
Unión Comercio footballers
Los Caimanes footballers
Uruguayan Primera División players
Peruvian Primera División players
Challenger Pro League players
Paraguayan Primera División players
Expatriate footballers in Peru